Jacqueline Gandar (born 17 June 1994) is a French long-distance runner.

In 2016, she competed in the women's half marathon at the 2016 European Athletics Championships held in Amsterdam, Netherlands.

In 2018, she competed in the women's half marathon at the 2018 IAAF World Half Marathon Championships held in Valencia, Spain. She finished in 81st place.

References

External links 
 

Living people
1994 births
Place of birth missing (living people)
French female long-distance runners